Government Post Graduate College Dargai Malakand is located in Dargai, Khyber Pakhtunkhwa, Pakistan. The college currently offers programs at Intermediate affiliated with Board of Intermediate and Secondary Education Malakand, Bachelor, Master and 4 years BS programs in various disciplines.

Overview & History 
Government Post Graduate College Dargai Malakand is situated college in Dargai Malakand. The college as intermediate college in July 1977. The college attained degree college status in August 1983. Computer Science course was introduced in 2002.

The college campus has total area of 36 acres. The latest addition to college teaching programs are BS 4-year programs in the subject Computer Science, English, Zoology, Botany, Chemistry, Physics, Maths, Urdu and Political Science.

Departments and Faculties 
The college currently has the following faculties.

Faculty of Social Sciences 
 Department of Economics
 Department of English
 Department of Geography
 Department of History
 Department of Islamiyat
 Department of Law
 Department of Pakistan Studies
 Department of Physical Education
 Department of Political Science
 Department of Pashto
 Department of Urdu

Faculty of Biological Sciences 
 Department of Zoology
 Department of Botany

Faculty of Physical Sciences 
 Department of Chemistry
 Department of Computer Science
 Department of Maths
 Department of Statistics
 Department of Physics

Academic programs 
The college currently offers the following programs.

Intermediate
 This institution doesn't offer any program on intermediate level.
College has been closed.

Master Level (2 years)
 MSc – Mathematics
 MSc - Chemistry
 MA - English

BS Degrees (4 years)
 BS Computer Science
 BS English
 BS Mathematics
 BS Chemistry
 BS Political Science
 BS Economics
 BS Physics
 BS Statistics
 BS Electronics
 BS Zoology
 BS Gender Studies
 BS Urdu

See also 
 University of Malakand
 Shaheed Benazir Bhutto University, Sheringal

External links 
 Government Post Graduate College Dargai Official Website

References 

Public universities and colleges in Khyber Pakhtunkhwa
Malakand District